This is a list of former employees of the professional wrestling promotion Juggalo Championship Wrestling (JCW), formerly Juggalo Championshit Wrestling or Juggalo Championshxt Wrestling. On 19 December 1999, JCW was launched and released several DVDs in the following years. In the early days of the company, talent often only appeared a couple of times before disappearing, or wrestlers accepted bookings with other companies, resulting in extended absences from JCW.

The talent itself consisted of a mix of rappers, independent wrestlers, and well known names from promotions such as World Wrestling Federation (now World Wrestling Entertainment), Extreme Championship Wrestling, and World Championship Wrestling, with many of them performing under pseudonyms or parody alternate-names. JCW began broadcasting the internet wrestling show SlamTV! on 7 April 2007. The show instituted a change in JCW's roster, with the promotion focusing on independent and hardcore wrestlers, while also bringing in established names on a consistent basis.

This list is organized alphabetically by the wrestlers' real names. In the case of wrestlers who have had multiple stints in the company, the date of their last appearance is used.

Alumni

Male wrestlers